The Canada Sevens is an annual rugby sevens tournament held every March. It is one of the ten stops on the World Rugby Sevens Series, and is played the weekend after the USA Sevens in Las Vegas. Canada secured a four-year deal to host to event from the 2015–16 season. The tournament is played at BC Place in Vancouver.

Event winners

Attendance

See also
 Canada Women's Sevens

References

External links
 Canada Sevens official website

 
World Rugby Sevens Series tournaments
Recurring sporting events established in 2016
International rugby union competitions hosted by Canada
2016 establishments in British Columbia
Rugby union in British Columbia